Vadis Turner (born 1977) is an American mixed media artist. Vadis Turner has synthesized the practice of painting with repurposed textiles.

Early life and education
Turner was born in Nashville, Tennessee and lives and works in Brooklyn. She received BFA and MFA degrees from Boston University.

Career
Turner is an Adjunct Assistant Professor of art at Pratt Institute.

As an artist, Turner has been described as striving for the "transcendence of the commonplace from its intended function into a vehicle for social commentary." Her works are permanently exhibited in several American museums and galleries, including the 21C Museum, Brooklyn Museum of Art, Andy Warhol Museum, Kentucky Arts and Crafts Museum, and Tennessee State Museum, as well as in the Egon Schiele Art Centrum in the Czech Republic.. In 2017 Turner's first solo museum exhibition, Tempest, was exhibited at the Frist Center for the Visual Arts.

In 2013, Turner was chosen as a resident artist by Materials for the Arts, where she created mixed media pieces with fashion industry textile scraps. MFTA described Turner's work as "'paint[ing]' with ribbon and fabric": "She uses ribbons as lines, marks, and brushstrokes, large wads of fabric as stains of color, and smaller pieces as drips of hues."

Reception
Turner's work at the "Fashion Forward" exhibition at the Islip Art Museum was reviewed by art critic Benjamin Genocchio for the New York Times, who states that Turner "re-creates delicate, lacy women's underwear using waxed paper and dental floss." In a review of her exhibition "Past Perfection" at the Geary Contemporary, Kirsten O'Regan and Lauren Holter, writing for the New York Daily News, state that Turner "provokes the viewer into considering woven works as high art—even if some of that art is made from tampons."

References

External links
 

1977 births
Living people
American contemporary artists
Artists from Brooklyn
Pratt Institute faculty
Boston University alumni
People from Nashville, Tennessee